Ken Estin is an American television producer and screenwriter. He has worked on Taxi and Cheers and co-created The Tracey Ullman Show with James L. Brooks. In 1982 Ken won an Emmy Award for Best Writing in a Comedy Series for the episode "Elegant Iggy" featuring Christopher Lloyd on Taxi and in 1989 he won an Emmy Award for producing The Tracey Ullman Show. Ken has had an additional eleven Emmy Award nominations. Furthermore, he won the 1979 Writers Guild of America Award. Estin received a special "thank you" credit in the feature film Big, and he rewrote the screenplay for Beverly Hills Cop.

Ken Estin worked on as executive producer for the short-lived NBC/UPN show Minor Adjustments through Ken Estin Entertainment.

References

External links
 

Emmy Award winners
Writers Guild of America Award winners
Living people
Year of birth missing (living people)